Karan Singh is an Indian politician from a town in Baran district in Rajasthan state of Republic of India. He was member of Rajasthan Legislative Assembly during 2008–2013, elected from Chhabra constituency. He is member of Indian National Congress Party.

References

Indian National Congress politicians
Living people
Rajasthan MLAs 2008–2013
Year of birth missing (living people)
Indian National Congress politicians from Rajasthan